The Maserati 200S (Tipo 52) is a racing car made by Italian automobile manufacturer Maserati as a successor to the Maserati A6GCS. 28 cars were made in total. The development of the 200S, codenamed Tipo 52 started in 1952, led by Vittorio Bellentani. In response to Ferrari's 500 Mondial racing car which featured a four-cylinder engine and was quite successful in sports car racing. The car had a  inline-four light-alloy engine, featuring dual overhead valves per cylinder and twin camshafts, double Weber 50DCO3 (first few cars only) or 45DCO3 carburetors. Many chassis components were identical to the Maserati 150S in order to speed up development, except the rigid rear axle inherited from the Maserati A6.

Maserati made the first three chassis internally, but outsourced a tubular chassis to Gilco which was modified by Maserati. The first five aluminium bodies were made by Celestino Fiandri, and the 23 final bodies were made by Medardo Fantuzzi.

The 200S debuted at the 1955 Imola Grand Prix, driven Franco Bordoni, but yielded disappointing results. The 200S was then entered at the 1955 Targa Florio driven by Giovanni Bracco and Bordoni along with a 150S. Both cars were forced to retire, with Maserati winning the race with a A6GCS driven by Francesco Giardini. 

In 1956, Maserati entered three new 200S' at the Supercortemaggiore GP. Problems with the suspension would be resolved by fitting two cars with a De dion bridge attached to the differential with a sliding pin at the rear. The third car had a conventional rear axle. The first car suffered damage in practicing round while the second one would retire during the race after only one lap. The third car would finish 27 seconds behind the winning Ferrari 250 Testa Rossa. At the Bara GP, the car would show more promising results by winning the race outright.

In 1957 a new variant called the Maserati 200SI, Sport Internazionale, was introduced to conform to international sports car racing rules. The SI featured a wider windscreen, wipers, doors and a neat hood design to keep the rain out when the car was parked rather than protecting the driver from these elements during a race. One of the 200SI (chassis 2407) was a converted 150S.

The 200S was then replaced by the 250S which featured an enlarged  engine. Most of the 250S cars were 200S converted to 250S specifications: Four of the 200SI built were thus converted, while only two were built from the ground up. The 250S also proved uncompetitive.

References

External links
 maserati-alfieri.co.uk on the 200S

Literature
 Karl Ludvigsen, Maserati 200S/200SI

200S
Sports racing cars

sv:Maserati 150S